Dimitry Vladimirovich Kochenov is a professor of legal studies at the Central European University.

Career
Before returning to CEU, Dimitry Vladimirovich was a professor at the University of Groningen. The Economist, FT,  NYT, BBC, CBC, NBC, Le Monde,  Rzeczpospolita and other outlets have paid attention to Dimitry's work or published his op-eds and interviews.

In his academic work, he has criticized citizenship as an unjustifiable form of apartheid, comparing it to racism, sexism, and slavery, and advocated its complete abolition. He has defended golden passport schemes and criticized attempts of the European Commission to restrict them.

Conflict of interest controversy 
Following a 2019 investigation by Dutch news program Nieuwsuur into passport trade, University of Groningen conducted an investigation into Kochenov's paid consulting activities related to citizenship by investment or investment naturalisation (so-called "passport trade"), including his role with Henley & Partners and advising Malta on a law change to allow citizenship by investment.

In 2020, a University of Groningen investigation resulted in a warning, but concluded that while Kochenov failed to comply with the approval procedure for additional activities set out in the applicable regulations, he was not involved in the alleged ‘Maltese passport trade’.

Kochenov has received a mixture of criticism and support from academic colleagues on the matter of academic integrity. After the investigation, Prof. Kochenov left Groningen for the CEU.

Works

See also
Henley Passport Index
Quality of Nationality Index

References

External links

Academic staff of the University of Groningen
Scholars of citizenship
Year of birth missing (living people)
Living people